Łuknajno  is a lake in the Masurian Lake District of north-eastern Poland, in Warmian-Masurian Voivodeship.

The lake is the site of a nature reserve, and since 1977 has been designated a UNESCO Biosphere Reserve and a Ramsar site, in view of its importance as a breeding ground for water birds such as grebe, rail, moorhen, grey heron, bearded tit, white-tailed eagle, osprey, rust-coloured kite, cormorant and black tern. The lake is known since many decades as the habitat of the mute swan – nesting there every year from a dozen to tens of dozen of pairs, and in time of moult arriving in numbers reaching up to 2,000 birds. The lake is part of the larger protected area known as Masurian Landscape Park.

The bottom of the lake is 77% covered with brachiopods (Characeae), potworms (Potamogeton) and spearguns (Myriophyllum). At the banks, there is a strip of reed rush with a small admixture of narrow-leaved cattail and lake bulrush. On the southern and eastern shores, there is a strip of willow thickets and fragments of alders. This creates a favorable shelter for bird nesting and significantly enriches the biotope.

See also
 Puszcza Piska forest
 Masuria region

References

External links
Łuknajno Lake: UNESCO biosphere reserve description

Lakes of Warmian-Masurian Voivodeship
Biosphere reserves of Poland
Nature reserves in Poland
Natura 2000 in Poland
Ramsar sites in Poland